This article covers the 2016–17 season for Vllaznia Shkodër. They participate in the Kategoria Superiore.

Competitions

Kategoria Superiore

League table

Results summary

Results by round

References

Vllaznia Shkodër
KF Vllaznia Shkodër seasons